Eupithecia acragas is a moth species in the  family Geometridae with a type locality in Bolivia. It's also known from Ecuador, where some specimens have been found in the southern province Zamora-Chinchipe at altitudes between 2200 and 2700 m.

References

Moths described in 1987
acragas
Moths of South America